Pat Ngoho is an American Artist and Skateboarder from Los Angeles, California. Ngoho's painting's utilize a self termed style called "Free Abandonment". As a skateboarder Ngoho is known for his innovative approach and inventing popular tricks including the Manual Roll. He is a co-founder of the Love and Guts Art Collective.

Artistic development
As a youth and upcoming skater, Pat spent many hours at the Marina Skatepark. It was there where he met Ivan Hosoi father of good friend and fellow skater Christian Hosoi. Ivan worked at the skatepark and was a classically trained contemporary artist who studied at the University of California, Berkeley under RB Kitaj, David Hockney and was also an understudy of Sam Francis. "It was through Ivan that I began to grasp the immense gravity and emotive capacity of art. Ivan had a bluntness and a cold serious simplicity of how he discussed art and other topics. We talked about the Impressionist, Expressionism, Modern, Post-Modern, Architecture, The Vietnam War, Manzanar, Charles Bukowski, Zen Archery, Jimi Hendrix, Bruce Lee and so on, for years".

Artistic style, the Project of Art and influences
Many of Pat Ngoho's painting's are finished in a thick impasto technique, as he referred to it as "Scribbling with creepy peanut butter" And went on to say the "Project of Art is to dig deep into the human experience, to unearth that what is hidden and to slaughter ideas, concepts and fears, to burn old decrepit books, clear rotting debris and till the soil as to make way for the new dawn.  
Ngoho has stated his painting influences are Elmer Bischoff, Phillip Guston, Georg Baselitz, Joan Brown and Selden Connor Gile

Love and Guts
The Art Collective was founded in 2005 by Ngoho and fellow Artist / Skateboarders, Lance Mountain and Steve Olson. The show's primary focus is to underscore skateboarding as an art form. Other featured artist include Steve Alba, Christian Hosoi and Steve Caballero.

Exhibitions and collections
Through the Love and Guts Art Collective and fellow German Artist Ulrich Wulff, Ngoho has shown extensively throughout, participating in shows in Australia, New Zealand, Santiago, Tokyo, Bilbao, Prague, London, Groningen, New York and Shizuoka (city). His art is collected by Ben Harper.

Contest and video appearances
Pat Ngoho has won multiple contest and championships, including 3 Consecutive Wins Pro-Masters New Zealand Bowl-A-Rama (2015-2017), Winner Pro-Masters Bowl-A-Rama Basque Country Spain (2016), 3x Winner Pro-Masters Oregon Trifecta (Battleground 2007), (West Linn 2008), (Aumsville 2009), Multiple X-Games Pro-Masters Finals, Multiple Dew Tour Pro-Masters Finals, 3x World Cup of Skateboarding Pro-Masters World Champion (2008, 2010, 2012), 2x Winner Pro-Masters Australian Bowl Championships (ABC), First Place Pro-Ramp Bourge France (1987), Multiple NSA Pro-Street Finals, 5th Place Pro Street Munster Championships, Munster Germany (1990),1980 Gold Cup Pro-Am, 2nd (Colton), 4th (Marina) 4th Place AM Lakewood Pro-Am), 19th Place Dog Bowl Pro - Marina Del Rey (1979)   
Skate Videos; Speed Freaks, Savannah Slamma 3, Rolling with the Z-Boys, Underexposed; A Women’s Skateboarding Documentary

References

Cooper, C (January 2008 )Interview: Pat Ngoho. blisss magazine 01-08
http://www.newswire.co.nz/2010/03/skateboarder-honours-fallen-colleagues/

American artists
Living people
1964 births
Artist skateboarders